Parkside, New Jersey may refer to the following places in New Jersey:
Parkside, Camden
Parkside, Trenton, New Jersey